Camp Howze can mean either of two US Army bases:

 Camp Howze, Texas
 Camp Howze, South Korea